Erin Stern is an American IFBB fitness professional and figure competitor and former Figure Olympia.

Early life
Erin Elyse Stern was born on February 5, 1980, to a religious Jewish family. Erin Elyse Stern was born in a family of athletes. Her father played football for C.W. Post and Adelphi University, and her mother ran three miles a day. She started horse riding in competitions at a young age, and later developed a passion for running, just like her mother, which led her to her track career.

Education
Stern followed her father’s advice when he encouraged her to win a collegiate scholarship to the University of Florida, where she earned Junior All-American status in the high jump Erin attended the University of Florida where she graduated with a BA in Environmental Policy.

Bodybuilding career

Last 3 Centimeters 
As a Junior All-American at the University of Florida, Erin Stern had been competing in pentathlons and heptathlons. She missed the qualifying standard for the Beijing Olympics by three centimeters.

Dejected, Erin Stern was forced to give up her Olympics dreams. “I’m a little short for a high-jumper,” says the statuesque 5-foot-8 Stern, chuckling. “I gave it my all, but I couldn’t make the last three centimeters.”

Competitive historyBodybuilding.com Erin Stern profile and pictures

Till 2011
2008 NPC National Bodybuilding and Figure Championships — 1st Place
2009 IFBB Arnold Classic — 10th Place
2009 IFBB Europa Show of Champions — 5th Place
2009 IFBB Jacksonville Pro — 2nd Place
2009 IFBB Houston Pro Figure — 2nd Place
2009 IFBB Figure Olympia — 6th Place
2009 IFBB Fort Lauderdale Pro Fitness and Figure — 2nd Place
2010 IFBB Arnold Classic — 2nd Place
2010 IFBB Europa Show of Champions — 1st Place
2010 IFBB Figure Olympia — 1st Place
2011 IFBB Arnold Classic — 2nd Place
2011 IFBB Australian Pro Grand Prix XI — 1st Place
2011 IFBB New Zealand Pro Figure — 1st Place
2011 IFBB Olympia - 2nd Place
2011 IFBB Jacksonville Pro- 1st Place

2012
2012 Figure International — 2nd Place
2012 Australian Pro Figure Classic — 1st Place
2012 Valenti Classic Pro Figure — 1st Place
2012 Figure Olympia — 1st Place
2012 Sheru Classic — 1st Place
2012 Arnold Classic Europe — 1st Place

2013
2013 Arnold Classic — 3rd Place
2013 Australia Pro — 2nd place
2013 Valenti Classic - 1st place
2013 Figure Olympia — 2nd Place

2014
2014 IFBB Australia Pro Grand Prix XIV - 6th Place

2020
2020 IFBB Hurricane Pro - 10th
2020 IFBB Ny Pro - 7th
2020 IFBB Klash World Championship - 10th
2020 IFBB Tampa Pro -10th

2021
2021 IFBB Atlantic Coast Pro - 4th
2021 IFBB Bikini Olympia - 15th
2021 IFBB Tahoe Show - 1st Place
2021 IFBB Janet Layug's Battle of the Bodies - 7th
2021 IFBB Republic of Texas - 2nd
2021 IFBB NY Pro - 12th
2021 IFBB GRL PWR - 13th

See also
List of female fitness & figure competitors
Arnold Classic

References

External links
Official website
Erin Stern's Fitness Challenge

Living people
1980 births
Sportspeople from Tampa, Florida
Jewish American sportspeople
Fitness and figure competitors
American sportswomen
21st-century American Jews
21st-century American women